Neoseiulella is a genus of mites in the Phytoseiidae family.

Species
 Neoseiulella aceri (Collyer, 1957)
 Neoseiulella armidalensis (Schicha & Elshafie, 1980)
 Neoseiulella arutunjani (Kuznetsov, 1984)
 Neoseiulella ashleyae (Chant & Yoshida-Shaul, 1989)
 Neoseiulella canariensis Ferragut & Pena-Estevez, 2003
 Neoseiulella carmeli (Rivnay & Swirski, 1980)
 Neoseiulella cassiniae (Collyer, 1982)
 Neoseiulella celtis Denmark & Rather, 1996
 Neoseiulella compta (Corpuz-Raros, 1966)
 Neoseiulella coreen Walter, 1997
 Neoseiulella corrugata (Schicha, 1983)
 Neoseiulella cottieri (Collyer, 1964)
 Neoseiulella crassipilis (Athias-Henriot & Fauvel, 1981)
 Neoseiulella dachanti (Collyer, 1964)
 Neoseiulella elaeocarpi (Schicha, 1993)
 Neoseiulella eleglidus (Tseng, 1983)
 Neoseiulella elongata Ferragut & Pena-Estevez, 2003
 Neoseiululla farraguti Moraza & Pena-Estevez, 2006
 Neoseiulella litoralis (Swirski & Amitai, 1984)
 Neoseiulella manukae (Collyer, 1964)
 Neoseiulella montforti (Rivnay & Swirski, 1980)
 Neoseiulella myopori (Collyer, 1982)
 Neoseiulella nesbitti (Womersley, 1954)
 Neoseiulella novaezealandiae (Collyer, 1964)
 Neoseiulella oleariae (Collyer, 1982)
 Neoseiulella perforata (Athias-Henriot, 1960)
 Neoseiulella runiacus (Kolodochka, 1980)
 Neoseiulella schusteri (Yousef & El-Brollosy, 1986)
 Neoseiulella spaini (Collyer, 1982)
 Neoseiulella splendida Ferragut & Pena-Estevez, 2003
 Neoseiulella steeli (Schicha & McMurtry, 1986)
 Neoseiulella steveni (Schicha, 1987)
 Neoseiulella tiliarum (Oudemans, 1930)
 Neoseiulella tuberculata (Wainstein, 1958)
 Neoseiulella vollsella (Chaudhri, Akbar & Rassol, 1974)

References

Phytoseiidae